Len Pasquarelli is an American sports writer and analyst with The Sports Xchange and a 25-year veteran of covering the National Football League (NFL). The Sports Xchange is a network of professional, accredited reporters and analysts who cover each team or sport full-time.

Prior to joining the Sports Xchange, he wrote for ESPN.com  starting in 2001 and was a frequent contributor to the other ESPN outlets, including SportsCenter, ESPNEWS, ESPN Radio and ESPN The Magazine. Before ESPN, Pasquarelli served as a senior writer for CBS SportsLine.com. He has also covered the NFL for the Atlanta Journal-Constitution from 1989 to 1999, the Fort Wayne News-Sentinel from 1985 to 1989, Pro Football Weekly from 1982 to 1985, and Pittsburgh Steelers Weekly from 1978 to 1982.

Pasquarelli is a member of the Pro Football Writers of America and has twice won national awards as the Best NFL Reporter of the Year. He also has won several writing awards, including an Associated Press Deadline Sports Reporting Award in 1988.

Pasquarelli has been on the committee that selects inductees for the Pro Football Hall of Fame. During the annual selection meeting on February 2, 2008, he fell ill and was taken to an area hospital. The following day he had quintuple bypass surgery. 
 While in rehabilitation for the bypass surgery, he began to experience new symptoms which were later diagnosed as Guillain–Barré syndrome.

Pasquarelli is a Pittsburgh, Pennsylvania native and graduated from the University of Pittsburgh in 1972. He currently resides in Atlanta, Georgia.

Pasquarelli's candid writing style has generated controversy at times, particularly his condemnation of the Washington Redskins franchise. He has openly admitted his distaste for the Redskins organization, including former coach Joe Gibbs, to whom he referred derisively as "Ordinary Joe" during his second tenure. Moreover, he has confessed to disliking Redskins owner Daniel Snyder. His speculation that former Redskins safety Sean Taylor was slain on account of his precarious lifestyle sparked additional resentment.

References

External links 
Pasquarelli’s sports columns from ESPN.com

Dick McCann Memorial Award recipients
Writers from Pittsburgh
University of Pittsburgh alumni
Living people
Year of birth missing (living people)
ESPN Radio
Sportswriters from Pennsylvania
People with Guillain–Barré syndrome